Petra Kvitová was the defending champion, but lost in the final round of qualifying.

Alona Bondarenko won in the final, 6–2, 6–4, against Shahar Pe'er.

Seeds

  Anabel Medina Garrigues (semifinals)
  Shahar Pe'er (final)
  Kateryna Bondarenko (second round)
  Alona Bondarenko (champion)
  Carla Suárez Navarro (quarterfinals)
  Aleksandra Wozniak (second round)
  Zheng Jie (quarterfinals)
  Gisela Dulko (quarterfinals)

Draw

Finals

Top half

Bottom half

External links
Main Draw
Qualifying Draw

Singles
Hobart International – Singles